John Oxberry (4 January 1901–1962) was an English footballer who played in the Football League for Aldershot, Blackpool, Reading and South Shields.

References

1901 births
1962 deaths
English footballers
Association football forwards
English Football League players
Gateshead A.F.C. players
Blackpool F.C. players
Reading F.C. players
Aldershot F.C. players
Ashington A.F.C. players